Illinois Route 132 (IL 132) is an arterial state road that connects IL 59 at the village line between Fox Lake Hills and Lake Villa, with IL 131 in Waukegan.

Route description 

Illinois 132 serves the town of Gurnee. Grand Avenue is the main road to both the Gurnee Mills Shopping Center and Six Flags Great America. At this point Illinois 132 is a divided, six lane road—its length wavers between 2 and 6 lanes around Gurnee.

Because Route 132 is a well-traveled road in suburban Chicago, it is also a major suburban Chicago shopping and industry corridor, especially on the Grand Avenue section of the route. A variety of car dealers, retail stores, full-service restaurants, mid-range hotels, etc. are located on this roadway.

History 
SBI Route 132 was initially what is now Illinois Route 121 from Decatur to Mattoon in central Illinois; in 1937, Illinois 121 replaced Illinois 131 and Illinois 132. In 1950 it was reassigned to the whole stretch of Grand Avenue; in 1967 it was dropped east of Illinois 131 and west of Illinois Route 59.

Major intersections

References

External links

132
Transportation in Lake County, Illinois
Gurnee, Illinois
Waukegan, Illinois